Rent Boys (German: Die Jungs vom Bahnhof Zoo) is a 2011 German documentary film directed, written and produced by Rosa von Praunheim. The film was shown at the Berlin International Film Festival and the Queer Lisboa International Film Festival in 2011, for example.

Plot
The realities of life of male prostitutes in Berlin are dealt with through interviews with young men who are or were sexworkers. The film also gives an insight into the scene and the lives of these men. The film remains nonjudgmental and factual and shows the gay "hustler scene" as a social sub-milieu that is shaped by tragic fates as well as by everyday things and routines. Not only the direct sale of sexual services is discussed, but also other aspects of male prostitution such as poverty, drug addiction, mental stress, risk of sexually transmitted diseases, crime, migration, love and partnership. Innkeepers from bars where male sexworkers start their business, and clients of male prostitutes, such as the Austrian actor and director Peter Kern, also have their say.

Production notes
When making the film, Rosa von Praunheim worked together with street workers from the association Hilfe-für-Jungs in Berlin, which provides socio-educational, psychological and medical services for male sexworkers.

The film has already been shown over 25 times on German television.

Awards
 2012: Grimme-Preis 
 2013: Nominated for the "Best Documentary"-Award at the Merlinka Festival

Reception
"Von Praunheim's questions are clear and not suggestive. The surprising openness of the boys gives an idea of ​​the trust that the director enjoys in them and that is never abused in the film. This contributes greatly to authenticity." (Grimme-Preis Jury)

References

External links
 

2011 films
2011 documentary films
2011 LGBT-related films
Documentary films about male prostitution
Films about prostitution in Germany
Films directed by Rosa von Praunheim
German documentary films
2010s German-language films
German LGBT-related films
2010s German films